Wished Bone is the stage name of American musician Ashley Rhodus. Rhodus has collaborated with a cast of rotating characters and projects.

History
Wished Bone's debut EP, Pseudio Recordings, was included as the #2 Best Bandcamp release of 2015 on factmag.com, describing the debut as "the kind of gold you dream of hitting while digging around on Bandcamp, a reminder that there are still treasures waiting off the beaten path." Rhodus released a second album under Wished Bone in May 2018 titled Cellar Belly, which was recorded, produced and included performances by the band Bleach Day, in Burlington, Vermont. After the release of Cellar Belly, Wished Bone toured the United States extensively, often performing in living rooms and other DIY spaces. They also performed larger tours with acts including TV Girl, Spencer Radcliffe and RL Kelly. Wished Bone's third album, Sap Season, was released in November 2019.

References

Living people
American musicians
Year of birth missing (living people)